Catocala caesia is a moth of the family Erebidae. It is found in the mountains of south-eastern Arizona and south-western New Mexico, and southward through the Sierra Madre Occidental in Chihuahua.

The word caesia is the feminine form of the Latin adjective caesius (bluish), and refers to the bluish-gray color of the forewing. The Bluish-gray Underwing is suggested as a vernacular name.

The length of the forewings is 22.4 mm for males and 25 mm for females.

References

caesia
Moths described in 2010
Moths of North America